The Chicago Harbor Lock, also known as the Chicago River & Harbor Controlling Works, is a stop lock and dam located within the Chicago Harbor in Chicago, Illinois at the mouth of the Chicago River. It is a component of the Chicago Area Waterway System, and is used to control water diversion from Lake Michigan into the river and for navigation.

History
The lock was built between 1936 and 1938 by the Sanitary District of Chicago primarily as a means of limiting diversion of water from Lake Michigan, but also as a component of the project to reverse the flow of the Chicago River to improve the water quality of the lake and for improved navigation. It is one of two entrances from the Great Lakes to the Chicago Area Waterway System, the other entrance being the T.J. O'Brien Lock and Dam on the Calumet River.

In 1984, maintenance and operation of the lock was transferred to the U.S. Army Corps of Engineers, though operation of the controlling works sluice gates stayed with the Metropolitan Water Reclamation District.

Overview
Water level is controlled via gravity by partially opening and closing the lock gates.

The controlling works contains eight sluice gates along its piers, each measuring  x , allowing water from Lake Michigan into the river for navigational and sanitation purposes during normal weather operations, and for allowing water out of the swollen river into the lake during heavy rainfall periods as a measure of last resort for flood control purposes.

The Chicago Harbor Lock is the fourth-busiest lock in the nation for commercial use and the second-busiest in the nation for recreational use.

See also
 Chicago Harbor
 Chicago Area Waterway System
 Port of Chicago

References

External links

Transportation buildings and structures in Chicago
Locks of Illinois